Fiddlers' Bid are a Shetland based instrumental group known for playing contemporary arrangements of traditional Shetland fiddle tunes. The seven piece line-up consists of four fiddles, acoustic guitar, bass guitar and piano/Clàrsach.

The band have performed at some of the largest folk festivals in the world including the Smithsonian Folklife Festival, Cambridge Folk Festival, Festival Interceltique de Lorient and Celtic Connections, and have toured extensively including performances at Melbourne Concert Hall and Sydney Opera House.

Several members of the band play Ewen Thomson violins

Discography

 Around The World, Fiddlers’ Bid Recordings (1994)
 Hamnataing, Greentrax (1998)
 Da Farder Ben Da Welcomer, Greentrax (2001)
 Naked and Bare, Greentrax (2005)
 All Dressed in Yellow, Hairst Blinks Music (2009)

Awards and achievements
 Band members Chris Stout and Andrew Gifford have both won the Shetland Young Fiddler of the Year competition
 Festival Interceltique de Lorient, France, Winners of “La Trophe La Bolee de Corrigans” (1994)
 Scottish Folk Awards “Best Live Act” (2003)
 Australian Entertainment Industry Association's Helpmann Awards nomination “Best Contemporary Music Concert Presentation” (2003)
 Band member Catriona McKay won "Instrumentalist of the Year" in the Scots Trad Music Awards (2007,2014)
 Scots Trad Music Awards nomination "Best Live Act" (2005)
 Scots Trad Music Awards nomination "Scottish Folk Band of the Year" (2007)
 Scots Trad Music Awards winner "Album of the Year" for All Dressed in Yellow (2009)

References

External links
 Official website

Shetland music
1991 establishments in Scotland
Musical groups established in 1991
Organisations based in Shetland
Scottish fiddling
Shetland fiddlers